Clive Howard Victor Staley (14 May 1899 – 18 March 1985) was an English professional footballer who played as a forward for Sunderland.

References

1899 births
1985 deaths
People from Newhall, Derbyshire
Footballers from Derbyshire
English footballers
Association football forwards
Newhall Swifts F.C. players
Sunderland A.F.C. players
Stoke City F.C. players
Burton Town F.C. players
English Football League players